Pascual "Cuevas" Matos (born December 23, 1974 in Barahona Province, Dominican Republic) is a former Major League Baseball player. He played one season with the Atlanta Braves in 1999.

References

External links

1974 births
Atlanta Braves players
Central American and Caribbean Games bronze medalists for the Dominican Republic
Charlotte Knights players
Colorado Springs Sky Sox players
Columbus Clippers players
Dominican Republic expatriate baseball players in Canada
Dominican Republic expatriate baseball players in Italy
Dominican Republic expatriate baseball players in the United States
Durham Bulls players
Greenville Braves players
Gulf Coast Braves players
Idaho Falls Braves players

Living people
Macon Braves players
Major League Baseball catchers
Major League Baseball players from the Dominican Republic
Nashua Pride players
People from Barahona Province
Parma Baseball Club players
Richmond Braves players
Trois-Rivières Saints players
Yuma Bullfrogs players
Competitors at the 2002 Central American and Caribbean Games
Central American and Caribbean Games medalists in baseball
Azucareros del Este players